Stadion Wiener Neustadt, also known as the Teddybären & Plüsch-Stadion, is a stadium in Wiener Neustadt, Austria. It is mostly used for football matches. Currently its only tenant is SC Wiener Neustadt, though former Austrian champions 1. Wiener Neustädter SC have also played there. The stadium has also been used for speedway racing.

History 
Stadion Wiener Neustadt opened its gates on 19 May 1955. Its construction took three years. Upon its completion, former Nationalliga team 1. Wiener Neustädter SC used the stadium for their home matches, as did SV Admira Wiener Neustadt in the 1972–73 season.

The record attendance at the stadium was on 14 September 1963, when 12,000 people watched the match between SC Wiener Neustadt and Austria Wien and celebrated a surprise 1–0 home victory. Other highlights include the first leg of the Austrian Cup 1964–65 between SC Wiener Neustadt and LASK Linz and a match in the European Cup Winners' Cup 1965–66 against Romanian sides Ştiinţa Cluj on 1 September 1965.

During the 1980s, Stadion Wiener Neustadt was extensively modernized, including the installation of floodlights and the completion of the roofed main stand. The Austrian Supercup final was staged in the stadium in 1992. After SC Wiener Neustadt were relegated from the Austrian second division in 1995, no professional football was played in the stadium until 2008 when FC Magna Wiener Neustadt from nearby Oberwaltersdorf decided to play their home matches there.

Another renovation was made in 2008, at a cost of 1.2 million Euros. The existing floodlights were upgraded, and adaptions for spectators, players and the media were made.

References

External links 

 stadium section at www.sc.wiener-neustadt.at 
 Stadium image

Football venues in Austria
Sports venues in Lower Austria
Buildings and structures in Wiener Neustadt
SC Wiener Neustadt
1955 establishments in Austria
Sports venues completed in 1955
Sports venues demolished in 2020
20th-century architecture in Austria